Michael Klauß (born 20 April 1987 in Sindelfingen) is a German footballer who plays for SGV Freiberg.

References

External links 
 
 

1987 births
Living people
People from Sindelfingen
Sportspeople from Stuttgart (region)
German footballers
Footballers from Baden-Württemberg
Association football forwards
2. Bundesliga players
3. Liga players
Regionalliga players
VfB Stuttgart II players
SSV Jahn Regensburg players
VfR Aalen players